Like a Dream may refer to:

Like a Dream (album), by Darek Oleszkiewicz
"Like a Dream", an episode of Planetes